Evandoi Srivaru is a 2006 Indian Telugu drama film directed by Satti Babu and produced by M. Dasaratha Raju starring Srikanth, Sneha and Nikita Thukral in the lead roles. The music was composed by Srikanth Deva with cinematography by Ram Prasad.

Plot
Chandrasekhar (Sarath Babu) disowns his daughter Divya (Sneha) when she goes against his wishes and marries Surya (Srikanth). She later dies after accidentally falling off of the roof of her house. Before dying, Divya makes a final wish to her husband of having her son brought up by her father. Surya then does his best to fulfill her final wish.

Cast

 Srikanth as Surya
 Sneha as Divya
 Nikita Thukral as Sandhya
 Sarath Babu as Chandrasekhar
 Tanish as Divya's brother
 Rama Prabha as Aishwarya Rai
 Krishna Bhagavan as Watchman
 Chandra Mohan
 Sunil
 Venu Madhav
 Sudha
 M. S. Narayana
 Dharmavarapu Subrahmanyam as Apartment Secretary
Hema as Apartment Secretary's Wife
 Chittajalu Lakshmipati

Soundtrack 
Songs by Srikanth Deva. The song ""Adiga Brahmani" is based on "Azhage Bramhanidam" from Devathayai Kanden.
"Aandallu" – Mallikarjun, Sujatha
"Adiga Brahmani" – Karthik, K. S. Chitra
"Ayyaayyoo" – Ranjith, Pop Shalini
"Ippude" – Karthik, Sujatha
"Kalayoo" – Prasanna, Kalpana
"Vinayaka" – Tippu, Ganga

References

External links
 

2000s Telugu-language films
Indian drama films
Films directed by E. Satti Babu